Frédéric Roux (born 27 June 1973) is a retired French footballer who played as a goalkeeper.

His previous clubs include AS Nancy Lorraine, LB Châteauroux, FC Girondins de Bordeaux, where he won the Coupe de la Ligue in 2002, and AC Ajaccio.

Honours
Nancy
 Division 2: 1998

Bordeaux
 Coupe de la Ligue: 2002

Lyon
 Coupe de France: 2008
 Ligue 1: 2008

External links

OL official squad profile

1973 births
Living people
French footballers
Ligue 1 players
AS Nancy Lorraine players
LB Châteauroux players
FC Girondins de Bordeaux players
AC Ajaccio players
Olympique Lyonnais players
Association football goalkeepers
Sportspeople from Nancy, France
Footballers from Grand Est